The Skin of Our Teeth is a 1959 Australian television play based on the play by Thorton Wilder. It starred John Ewart.

Premise
The story of life on Earth as lived by Mr and Mrs Antrobus, and their two children - and their maid, Sabina.

Cast

John Ewart as Henry
Leonard Teale as Mr Antrobus/Mr Everyman
Aileen Britton as Mrs Antrobus/Mrs Everyman
Diana Davidson as Sabina the maid
Beryl Marshall as Gladys
Robert Hunt as the fortune teller
Nick Tate as the telegraph boy

Production
The film was directed by Alan Burke who had directed a production of Skin of Our Teeth on stage in Canberra in 1953 and had spent a day talking to Wilder in the US at the latter's New Haven home. Burke had met him through a letter of introduction while on a UNESCO scholarship. Burke considered the meeting with Wilder one of the most important of his life.

"He is the most knowledgeable man I've ever met," said Burke. "He is a great humanist and has great faith in mankind."

Two sets were used, one for the Antrobus house the other for Atlantic City boardwalk.

Reception

Burke said although the play had "tiny ratings... it represented the big break-through in the production of television plays."

See also
List of live television plays broadcast on Australian Broadcasting Corporation (1950s)

References

External links

1953 Australian theatre production at Ausstage

Australian television plays
1959 television plays
Films directed by Alan Burke (director)